Jessalyn Sarah Gilsig (born November 30, 1971) is a Canadian actress. She is best known for her roles as Lauren Davis in Boston Public, Gina Russo in Nip/Tuck, Terri Schuester in Glee, and as Siggy Haraldson in Vikings.

Early life
Gilsig was born in Montreal, Quebec, Canada, the daughter of Claire, a writer and translator, and Toby Gilsig, an engineer. She began her acting in a voice work part at age 12 for a National Film Board of Canada production, Masquerade. She is of Jewish descent.

Education
Gilsig attended McGill University in Montreal, from 1989 to 1993, graduating with a Bachelor of Arts degree in English in 1993. She later pursued her acting studies further at Harvard University's Institute for Advanced Theater Training.

Career

Gilsig began her career as a voice actress. She has done voices in the films such as Masquerade, and for television series such as Young Robin Hood.

She moved to New York City in 1995 where she appeared in several off-Broadway plays. However, it was her association with David E. Kelley that led to her starring role in Boston Public.

After guest-starring in two episodes of Kelley's The Practice, Gilsig was cast in two episodes of another Kelley program, the short-lived Snoops. Although the series was cancelled before Gilsig's episodes were broadcast, Kelley wrote the part of Lauren Davis in Boston Public specifically for her, a series that premiered in September 2000 on FOX; Gilsig would leave the series after the end of the second season in May 2002.

Following her departure from Boston Public, Gilsig joined the cast of Nip/Tuck in 2003 as Gina Russo, a role she continued until 2008. In 2004, she appeared in five episodes of NYPD Blue, followed by four episodes of FOX's Prison Break in 2005.

In addition to her extensive credits in television and theatre, Gilsig has appeared in film, beginning with a small role in the 1998 film The Horse Whisperer.  She then provided the speaking voice for Kayley in the animated film Quest for Camelot (1998), with Andrea Corr performing the character's songs.  In 2004 she starred in Chicks with Sticks, appeared in See This Movie, and in one of the lead roles in the 2007 film Flood.

In 2007–2008 she had recurring roles in two television series, playing Shelley, the sister of Tami Taylor, on NBC's Friday Night Lights, and Claire Bennet's biological mother, Meredith Gordon, on Heroes. Gilsig went on to play the main role of Terri Schuester on the Fox show, Glee, from 2009 to 2012.

In 2013, Gilsig was a series regular, portraying Siggy Haraldson, wife of Earl Haraldson and paramour of Ragnar Lothbrok's brother, Rollo, on the History Channel series Vikings until 2015. In 2017 she joined the cast of Scandal.

On January 24, 2020, Gilsig joined the cast of the Disney+ sports comedy-drama series Big Shot'' as Holly Barrett with John Stamos to replace Shiri Appleby.

Personal life
Gilsig met and briefly dated Bobby Salomon as a high school student – he was the football team quarterback she described as a "cool guy". Salomon, a film producer, moved to Hollywood in 2002, and the two began dating again. They were married on January 1, 2005, in a traditional Jewish wedding (Gilsig's father is Jewish). Gilsig and Salomon have a daughter.

Gilsig filed for divorce from Salomon on September 8, 2010, citing irreconcilable differences, having been separated since 2009. In 2013 Gilsig became an American citizen.

Filmography

Film

Television

Further reading

References

External links

Actresses from Montreal
Anglophone Quebec people
Canadian child actresses
Canadian film actresses
Canadian television actresses
Canadian voice actresses
Canadian emigrants to the United States
American child actresses
American film actresses
American television actresses
American voice actresses
Institute for Advanced Theater Training, Harvard University alumni
Jewish Canadian actresses
McGill University alumni
Living people
20th-century Canadian actresses
21st-century Canadian actresses
20th-century American actresses
21st-century American actresses
People with acquired American citizenship
1971 births